
Gmina Leśnica, German Gemeinde Leschnitz is an urban-rural gmina (administrative district) in Strzelce County, Opole Voivodeship, in Upper Silesia in Poland.

Since 2006 the commune, like much of the area, has been bilingual in German and Polish, a substantial German population remaining in the area after Silesia was given to Poland.

The gmina contains part of the protected area called Góra Świętej Anny Landscape Park.

Villages
The commune contains the towns and villages of:

Leśnica
Czarnocin
Dolna
Góra Świętej Anny
Granica
Kadłubiec
Krasowa
Kurzawka
Łąki Kozielskie
Lichynia
Popice
Poręba
Raszowa
Wysoka
Zalesie Śląskie

Neighbouring districts
Gmina Leśnica is bordered by the town of Kędzierzyn-Koźle and by the communes of Strzelce Opolskie, Ujazd and Zdzieszowice.

Twin towns – sister cities

Gmina Leśnica is twinned with:

 Černošice, Czech Republic
 Crostwitz, Germany
 Gerbrunn, Germany
 Hirschaid, Germany
 Karnes County, United States
 Voitsberg, Austria

Gallery

References

Lesnica
Bilingual communes in Poland